The 1924 World Series was the championship series of the 1924 Major League Baseball season. A best-of-seven playoff, the series was played between the American League (AL) pennant winner Washington Senators and the National League (NL) pennant winner New York Giants. The Senators defeated the Giants in seven games to win their first championship in club history. The Giants became the first team to play in four consecutive World Series, winning in 1921–1922 and losing in 1923–1924. Their long-time manager, John McGraw, made his ninth and final World Series appearance in 1924. The contest concluded with the second World Series-deciding game which ran to extra innings (the first had occurred in 1912).  In 1961, the Senators relocated to Minnesota and were rebranded as the Twins, subsequently winning the World Series in 1987 and in 1991.

Walter Johnson, after pitching his first 20-victory season (23) since 1919, was making his first World Series appearance, at the age of 36, while nearing the end of his career with the Senators. He lost his two starts, but the Senators battled back to force a Game 7, giving Johnson a chance to redeem himself when he came on in relief in that game. Johnson held on to get the win and give Washington its first championship. The seventh game is widely considered to be one of the most dramatic games in Series history.

Johnson struck out 12 Giants batters in Game 1 in a losing cause. Although that total matched Ed Walsh's number in the 1906 World Series, it came in 12 innings. Johnson struck out only nine in the first nine innings.

In Game 7, with the Senators behind 3–1 in the eighth, Bucky Harris hit a routine ground ball to third which hit a pebble and took a bad hop over Giants third baseman Freddie Lindstrom. Two runners scored on the play, tying the score at three. Walter Johnson then came in to pitch the ninth, and held the Giants scoreless into extra innings. With the score still 3–3, Washington came up in the 12th. With one out, and runners on first and second, Earl McNeely hit another grounder at Lindstrom, and again the ball took a bad hop, scoring Muddy Ruel with the Series-winning run.

This was the first World Series to use the 2–3–2 home game pattern, which would be adapted as the permanent format beginning the following year.

This was the Senators' only World Series championship victory during the franchise's time in Washington.

In 2020, ESPN named it the third greatest World Series of all-time.

Summary

Matchups

Game 1

The Senators tied it at 2–2 with a run in the bottom of the ninth.  The Giants scored two in the top of the 12th off the Big Train; Washington fought back for a run in the bottom of the inning, but left the tying run on third.

Game 2

Washington fought back early in the game, scoring 3 runs in 5 innings. But the Giants would quickly fight back in the final three frames to tie the game as it went to the bottom of the ninth. With Joe Judge representing the potential winning run and 1 out, Roger Peckinpaugh hit a double to win the game and tie the series.

Game 3

Washington threatened in the ninth. Ossie Bluege, the only man reliever Claude Jonnard faced, drew a bases-loaded walk to make it 6-4. Mule Watson then came in to nail down the last two outs. Rosy Ryan's fourth-inning home run is to date the only World Series home run by a relief pitcher.

Game 4

Goose Goslin had a big game for the Senators, with three singles and a home run to go 4-for-4 and drive in four runs.

Game 5

Johnson again pitched a complete game but the Giants recorded 13 hits off him, taking a 3–2 lead in the Series. Bentley broke a 1–1 tie in the fifth with a two-run home run, the second homer by a New York pitcher in the Series after Rosy Ryan's in Game 3.

Game 6

Both Washington runs scored on a single in the fifth inning by manager Bucky Harris. Tom Zachary won his second game of the series, deadlocking the series at three games each.

Game 7

The unheralded Curly Ogden was given the Game 7 start for Washington – it was his only World Series appearance.  He struck out a batter and walked one, and then was pulled for George Mogridge. It was later revealed that manager Bucky Harris started righthander Ogden so that the Giants would be locked into their "righthanded" lineup, before he switched to the lefthander Mogridge.

With the Senators trailing 3–1 in the eighth inning with bases loaded and two outs, Bucky Harris hit a "bad hop" ground ball to third which Fred Lindstrom failed to catch (no error was charged). As a result, two runs scored for a 3–3 tie. In the ninth inning, Walter Johnson would step up as pitcher and pitch four scoreless innings.

In the bottom of the 12th inning, Giants catcher Hank Gowdy stepped on his own discarded mask while trying to catch a Muddy Ruel foul pop-up, and dropped the ball for an error. Given a second chance in the at-bat, Ruel doubled. Johnson reached first on another error, and with Ruel on second and Johnson on first, Earl McNeely hit a "bad hop" ground ball to Lindstrom that was almost identical to Harris' eighth inning hit. Lindstrom again failed to catch the ball as it bounced over him into left field, and Ruel scored the series-winning run.

The game holds the record as the longest Game 7 (by innings) in postseason history.

In 2014, on the Series' 90th anniversary, the Library of Congress acquired a newsreel of highlight footage from Game 7, including McNeely's Series-winning base hit. CNN subsequently released this footage on its website.

Composite line score
1924 World Series (4–3): Washington Senators (A.L.) over New York Giants (N.L.)

Notes

See also
1924 Colored World Series

References

External links

World Series
World Series
Washington Senators (1901–1960) postseason
New York Giants (NL) postseason
World Series
1924 in sports in New York City
World Series
Baseball competitions in New York City
Baseball competitions in Washington, D.C.
1920s in Manhattan
Washington Heights, Manhattan